A list of films produced in Hong Kong in 1952:.

1952

References

External links
 IMDB list of Hong Kong films
 Hong Kong films of 1952 at HKcinemamagic.com

1952
Hong Kong
Films